Kayser is a derivation of the Germanic Kaiser surname, and may refer to:
 Kayser (surname)
 Kayser (band), a Swedish thrash metal band
 Kayser (unit) in spectroscopy, equal to reciprocal centimeter
 Kayser Airstrip, small airport in Suriname
 Kayser Mountain, Hall Land, Greenland
 Kayser Mountains, Sipaliwini, Suriname
 Kayser Sung, Asian journalist
 Kayser–Fleischer ring, a dark ring that appears to encircle the iris of the eye
 Kayser-Roth, a manufacturer of hosiery and intimate apparel
 Kayser-Threde, a company in Munich, Germany, developing equipment for astronautics, science and industry 
 George R. Kayser House, Arizona, United States
 Kayser's Beach, a village in South Africa
 Kayser, a unit of wavenumber in the CGS system, named after Heinrich Kayser

See also
 Kaiser (disambiguation)
 Kyser, a surname